"Ev'rything I've Got" (sometimes referred to as "Ev'rything I've Got Belongs to You") is a show tune from the Rodgers and Hart musical By Jupiter (1942), in which it was introduced by Ray Bolger and Benay Venuta.

Notable recordings
Ella Fitzgerald - Ella Fitzgerald Sings the Rodgers & Hart Songbook (1956)
Blossom Dearie - Blossom Dearie (1957)
Johnny Pace - Chet Baker Introduces Johnny Pace (1958)
Sara Gazarek - Blossom & Bee (2012)
Cécile McLorin Salvant - The Window (2018)

References

 Encyclopedia of the Musical Theatre Stanley Green, published by Dodd Mead, 1976

Songs with music by Richard Rodgers
Songs with lyrics by Lorenz Hart
1942 songs
Songs from Rodgers and Hart musicals